The 1968 Cincinnati Bengals season was the franchise's  inaugural season. Their head coach was Paul Brown, who left the Cleveland Browns following the 1962 season with National Football League (NFL) record of 115–49–6, seven conference titles, and three NFL championships. His son Mike Brown did a study on pro football expansion and recommended Cincinnati as a potential site. In 1965, Brown met with Governor of Ohio James Rhodes and the two agreed the state could accommodate a second pro football team. The team recorded its first win in franchise history in week 2 with a 24–10 victory over the Denver Broncos.

Timeline to establishment
 1966 – Fearful the Cincinnati Reds baseball team would leave town and feeling pressure from local businessmen pushing for a pro football franchise, Cincinnati's city council approved the construction of Riverfront Stadium.

 1967 – Brown's group was awarded an American Football League (AFL) expansion franchise. Brown named the team the Bengals, the name of Cincinnati's pro teams in the old AFL of the late 1930s. The Bengals acquired their first player late in the year when they traded two draft picks to Miami for quarterback John Stofa.

 1968 – The Bengals were awarded 40 veteran players in the allocation draft. In the college draft, they selected University of Tennessee center Bob Johnson as their first pick. The Bengals lost their first preseason game 38–14 to the Kansas City Chiefs before 21,682 fans at the University of Cincinnati's Nippert Stadium. The Bengals upset the Denver Broncos 24–10 and the Buffalo Bills 34–23 in their first two regular-season home games. Halfback Paul Robinson led the AFL in rushing with 1,023 yards and was named Rookie of the Year.

Offseason

Common draft

Pre-season

Regular season

Schedule

Standings

Game summaries

Week 1
 Friday September 6, 1968

at San Diego Stadium, San Diego, California
 Game time:
 Game weather:
 Game attendance:
 Referee:
 TV announcers:

Week 2
 Sunday September 15

Week 3
 Sunday September 22

Week 4
Sunday September 29

Week 5
Sunday October 6

Week 6
Sunday October 13

Week 7
Sunday October 20

Week 8
Sunday October 28

Week 9
Sunday November 3

Week 10
Sunday November 10

Week 11
Sunday, November 17

Week 12
Sunday November 24

Week 13
Sunday December 1

Week 14
Sunday December 8

Personnel

Staff/Coaches

Final roster

Awards and records

AFL Rookie of the Year
 RB Paul Robinson

AFL Pro Bowl Selections
 C Bob Johnson
 TE Bob Trumpy

Highlights
Paul Robinson led the AFL in rushing with 1023 yards and was named Rookie of the Year.

References 

Cincinnati Bengals
Cincinnati Bengals seasons
Cincinnati